Sodium butyrate is a compound with formula Na(C3H7COO). It is the sodium salt of butyric acid. It has various effects on cultured mammalian cells including inhibition of proliferation, induction of differentiation and induction or repression of gene expression. As such, it can be used in lab to bring about any of these effects. Specifically, butyrate treatment of cells results in histone hyperacetylation, and butyrate itself inhibits class I histone deacetylase (HDAC) activity, specifically HDAC1, HDAC2, HDAC3, and butyrate can be used in determining histone deacetylene in chromatin structure and function. Inhibition of HDAC activity is estimated to affect the expression of only 2% of mammalian genes.

In the lab, sodium butyrate is usually found as a white, water-soluble, crystalline solid. The chemical is notable for having a very strong, unpleasant smell that lingers. When working with sodium butyrate, gloves, eye protection and respiratory masks are advised for safety purposes.

The compound is found in human diet, notably produced in large amounts from dietary fiber in the gut and present in Parmesan cheese and butter.  Nevertheless, the most common source of sodium butyrate in the gut is from consumption of legumes.

See also
 Butyric acid

References

Further reading
 

Butyrates
GABA analogues
Organic sodium salts
Histone deacetylase inhibitors
Foul-smelling chemicals